Ingrid Oliver (born 25 February 1977) is a German-born British actress and comedienne, and one half of the comic double act Watson & Oliver. She is known for playing Petronella Osgood, a supporting character in the BBC television series Doctor Who.

Career

Oliver and her comedy partner Lorna Watson met at Tiffin Girls' School in Kingston upon Thames. In September 2005, Watson and Oliver performed their first show together at the Canal Cafe Theatre in London. Since then they have taken sell-out shows to Edinburgh Festival Fringe, in both 2006 and 2007.

Oliver has performed in various radio and television programmes, including Doc Martin starring Martin Clunes, The Penny Dreadfuls''' radio series The Penny Dreadfuls Present... The Brothers Faversham and the radio series Another Case of Milton Jones. She played the part of Natalie in Peep Show on Channel 4.

She appears in the film Angus, Thongs and Perfect Snogging as Miss Stamp, and in early 2009 could be seen in Channel 4's sitcom Plus One.

In 2010, Oliver played Mimi Throckmorton in Material Girl on BBC One, alongside Lenora Crichlow and Dervla Kirwan. In 2012, she appeared on Let's Dance For Sport Relief with comedy partner Lorna Watson, dancing Boléro, famously used by Torvill and Dean. The following year, she appeared in the first episode of The Great Comic Relief Bake Off and was named as 'Star Baker'. The same year, she appeared in the 50th anniversary special of Doctor Who, "The Day of the Doctor", as Petronella Osgood. She reprised the role in the episodes "Death in Heaven", "The Zygon Invasion", "The Zygon Inversion", UNIT, an audio drama spinoff series produced by Big Finish Productions, and Doctor Who: Redacted, a BBC radio drama spin-off series.

 Personal life 

Oliver was born to a German father and English mother. Her grandfather, Eric Gideon, was a D-Day veteran who died in 2017, shortly after receiving the Legion d'Honneur for his service to France during the war. Her mother is Conservative MP Jo Gideon, who became the Member of Parliament (MP) for Stoke-on-Trent Central in 2019. Oliver has British and German nationality.

She began a relationship with Richard Osman in 2021, they became engaged in May 2022 and married in December 2022. They met when she was a contestant on TV celebrity quiz show  Richard Osman's House of Games''.

Filmography

Film

Television

Stage

Video games

Radio

References

External links

1977 births
Living people
British film actresses
British television actresses
English women comedians
People educated at the Tiffin Girls' School
21st-century British actresses
21st-century British comedians